The Courier Journal,
also known as the
Louisville Courier Journal
(and informally The C-J or The Courier), and called The Courier-Journal between November 8, 1868, and October 29, 2017,
is the highest circulation newspaper in Kentucky. It is owned by Gannett and billed as "Part of the USA Today Network". According to the 1999 Editor & Publisher International Yearbook, the paper is the 48th-largest daily paper in the United States.

History

Origins
The Courier-Journal was created from the merger of several newspapers introduced in Kentucky in the 19th century.

A pioneer paper called The Focus of Politics, Commerce and Literature was founded in 1826 in Louisville when the city was an early settlement of less than 7,000 individuals.  In 1830 a new newspaper, The Louisville Daily Journal, began distribution in the city and, in 1832, the Journal absorbed The Focus of Politics, Commerce and Literature. The Louisville Journal was an organ of the Whig Party and was founded and edited by George D. Prentice, a New Englander who initially came to Kentucky to write a biography of Henry Clay. Prentice would proceed to edit the Journal for more than 40 years.

In 1844, another newspaper, the Louisville Morning Courier, was founded in Louisville by Walter Newman Haldeman. The Louisville Daily Journal and the Louisville Morning Courier were leading newspapers in Louisville and were politically opposed throughout the Civil War; The Journal was against slavery while the Courier was pro-Confederacy. The Courier was suppressed by the Union and had to move to Nashville, but it returned to Louisville after the war.

Upon the announcement of the Emancipation Proclamation that ended slavery in the Confederate states, the Journal opposed the Proclamation as an unconstitutional use of presidential power, and predicted: "Kentucky cannot and will not acquiesce in this measure. Never!"
In 1868, an ailing Prentice persuaded the 28-year-old Henry Watterson to come edit for the Journal. During secret negotiations in 1868, The Journal and the Courier merged, and the first edition of The Courier-Journal was delivered to Louisvillians on Sunday morning, November 8, 1868.

Watterson era

Henry Watterson, the son of a Tennessee congressman, had written for Harper's Magazine and The New York Times before enlisting in the Confederate Army. He became nationally known for his work as The Courier-Journal emerged as the region's leading paper. He supported the Democratic Party and pushed for the industrialization of Kentucky and the South in general, notably through urging the Southern Exposition be held in Louisville. He attracted controversy for attempting to prove that Christopher Marlowe had actually written the works of Shakespeare. He won a Pulitzer Prize in 1917 for editorials demanding the United States enter World War I.

The Courier-Journal founded a companion afternoon edition of the paper, The Louisville Times, in May 1884. In 1896, Watterson and Haldeman opposed Democratic presidential candidate William Jennings Bryan over his support of free silver coinage. This unpopular decision upset readers and advertisers, many of whom pulled their support for The Courier-Journal. Kentucky voted for the Republican candidate in 1896, the first time in state history, and local political leaders blamed the Courier. Only the popularity of The Louisville Times, which had no strong editorial reputation, saved the newspaper company from bankruptcy. The Courier supported Bryan in future elections.

Haldeman had owned the papers until his death in 1902, and by 1917 they were owned by his son, William, and Henry Watterson.

Bingham ownership

On August 8, 1918, Robert Worth Bingham purchased two-thirds interest in the newspapers and acquired the remaining stock in 1920. The liberal Bingham clashed with longtime editor Watterson, who remained on board, but was in the twilight of his career. Watterson's editorials opposing the League of Nations appeared alongside Bingham's favoring it, and Watterson finally retired on April 2, 1919.

As publisher, Bingham set the tone for his editorial pages, and pushed for improved public education, support of African Americans and the poor of Appalachia. In 1933, the newspapers passed to his son, Barry Bingham, Sr. Barry Bingham would continue in his father's footsteps, guiding the editorial page and modernizing the paper by setting up several news bureaus throughout the state, expanding the news staff. During Barry Bingham, Sr.'s tenure, the paper was considered Kentucky's "Newspaper of Record" and consistently ranked among the 10 best in the nation.

In 1971, Barry Bingham, Jr. succeeded his father as the newspapers' editor and publisher.

The Binghams were well-liked owners popularly credited with being more concerned with publishing quality journalism than making heavy profits. They also owned the leading local radio and television stations – WHAS-TV, WHAS-AM, and WAMZ-FM—and Standard Gravure, a rotogravure printing company that printed The Courier-Journal Sunday Magazine as well as similar magazines for other newspapers.

Barry Bingham Jr. sought to free the papers from conflicts of interests, and through The Louisville Times, experimented with new ideas such as signed editorials. Bingham Jr. also parted with tradition by endorsing several Republican candidates for office.

In 1974, Carol Sutton became managing editor of The Courier-Journal, the first woman appointed to such a post at a major US daily newspaper. Under the leadership of C. Thomas Hardin, director of photography, the combined photography staff of The Courier-Journal and Louisville Times was awarded the 1976 Pulitzer Prize for Feature Photography for its coverage of school desegregation in Louisville.

Barry Bingham, Jr. served as editor and publisher until he resigned in 1986, shortly after his father announced that the newspaper company was for sale, in large measure because of disagreements between Bingham Jr. and his sister Sallie.

Gannett ownership

On January 8, 1986, Barry Bingham Sr. announced his intent to sell the family owned media properties including the Courier-Journal. In July 1986, Gannett Company, Inc. purchased the newspaper company for $300 million, outbidding The Washington Post and the Tribune company. Gannett appointed George N. Gill President and Publisher who had been with the newspaper and the Binghams for over two decades. Gill worked his way up from copy editor to Chief Executive Officer of the Bingham Companies. In 1993, Gill retired and Edward E. Manassah became President and Publisher.

February 1987 saw the last publication of The Louisville Times, which like most afternoon papers had experienced declining readership; the news operations of the two papers had previously been consolidated under Gannett. The surviving Courier featured a strong news content increase by 29%.

In 1989, the paper's news staff won the Pulitzer Prize for general local reporting for what the Pulitzer board called "exemplary initial coverage" of a collision that was the nation's worst drunk-driving crash and school-bus accident. In 2005, cartoonist Nick Anderson won the paper's 10th Pulitzer, but when he left for the Houston Chronicle, the paper did not replace him, instead relying largely on submissions from local cartoonists. One, lawyer Marc Murphy, has become a near-regular and gained respect for his work.

The newspaper resumed polling on elections, and began video streaming its editorial-board conferences with major candidates, under Publisher Arnold "Arnie" Garson, who came from the Argus Leader, Gannett's paper in Sioux Falls, S.D., in late 2008. Garson is an outspoken promoter of the future of printed newspapers in the digital age. Under him, the paper began keeping occasional major stories or sports columns off its website and promoting them as print exclusives. Most of these have run on Sundays; in July 2009, Garson announced that the paper's Sunday home-delivery circulation was up 0.5 percent over the previous year.

Awards

Pulitzer Prize

Other notable staff

 Herbert Agar, Courier-Journal editor
 Anne and Carl Braden, Courier-Journal reporters and civil rights activists
 Adele Brandeis, Courier-Journal writer and arts administrator
 Samuel C. Brightman, Courier-Journal reporter and Washington correspondent
 Grady Clay, Courier-Journal urban affairs editor
 Byron Crawford, Courier-Journal columnist
 Joe Creason, Courier-Journal columnist, known for "Joe Creason's Kentucky" column
 Howard Fineman, Courier-Journal reporter and Washington correspondent
 Pat Forde, Courier-Journal sports columnist
 Michael Gartner, Courier-Journal editor
 Kate Harrington, Louisville Journal reporter
 Hugh Haynie, Courier-Journal political cartoonist
 Paul Janensch, Courier-Journal executive editor
 Mike King, Courier-Journal reporter, editor, Washington correspondent, and medical writer
 Alan Levy, Courier-Journal reporter
 Ronni Lundy, Courier-Journal and Louisville Times pop music editor
 Priscilla Robertson, Courier-Journal literary editor
 Harvey Magee Watterson, Courier-Journal editorial staff, father of the paper's founder

See also

 Branzburg v. Hayes – landmark Supreme Court case involving a Courier-Journal reporter
 Lexington Herald-Leader – second largest newspaper in Kentucky
 Louisville Eccentric Observer (aka LEO Weekly or LEO) – free urban alternative weekly newspaper
 News and Tribune – six-day daily newspaper serving Clark and Floyd Counties in Southern Indiana
 Scripps National Spelling Bee – formerly the National Spelling Bee, organized by The Courier-Journal in 1925
 Velocity (2003–2011) – free weekly magazine published by The Courier-Journal
 List of newspapers in Kentucky

References

Further reading
 Merrill, John C. and Harold A. Fisher. The world's great dailies: profiles of fifty newspapers (1980) pp 192–95

External links

 
 Gannett subsidiary profile of The Courier-Journal (archived from November 26, 2018)

 
Publications established in 1868
Pulitzer Prize-winning newspapers
1868 establishments in Kentucky
Pulitzer Prize for Public Service winners
Gannett publications